

The Levasseur PL.400 was an artillery observation / liaison aircraft built by Société Pierre Levasseur Aéronautique in the late 1930s.

The PL.400 was a high-wing monoplane of wood and metal construction. The aircraft first flew on December 19, 1939, but was later burned intentionally in June 1940 to avoid capture by German forces.

PL.400The first prototype, powered by a  Potez 9C radial engine; one built.
PL.401The second prototype, powered by a  Renault 6Q-09 in-line engine; completed but not flown before the French collapse in 1940.

Specifications

See also

References

1930s French military reconnaissance aircraft
Levasseur aircraft
Single-engined tractor aircraft
Aircraft first flown in 1939